Rúben Diogo Francisco Freitas (born 2 January 1993) is a Portuguese professional footballer who plays for Penafiel as a defender.

Football career
On 21 July 2018, Freitas made his professional debut with Mafra in a 2018–19 Taça da Liga match against Sporting Covilhã.

References

External links

1993 births
People from Odivelas
Sportspeople from Lisbon District
Living people
Portuguese footballers
Association football defenders
S.C. Braga B players
S.C. Salgueiros players
Nikos & Sokratis Erimis FC players
Lincoln Red Imps F.C. players
U.D. Vilafranquense players
C.D. Mafra players
C.D. Nacional players
F.C. Penafiel players
Primeira Liga players
Liga Portugal 2 players
Cypriot Second Division players
Gibraltar Premier Division players
Portuguese expatriate footballers
Expatriate footballers in Cyprus
Portuguese expatriate sportspeople in Cyprus
Expatriate footballers in Gibraltar
Portuguese expatriate sportspeople in Gibraltar